The Laurel Fork Railway was a small, standard-gauge logging railroad that operated entirely in Carter County, Tennessee from 1912 to 1927. Built by the Pittsburgh Lumber Company to serve a double-band sawmill at Braemar, in present-day Hampton, Tennessee. 

Lines and spurs carried timber from 12,000 acres (48,000 km²) of the mountainous watershed of the Laurel Fork of the Doe River that was estimated to contain 150 million board feet (350,000 m³) of lumber. 

A proposed interchange with the East Tennessee and Western North Carolina Railroad failed over inability to negotiate rates favorable to both companies. As a result, the Laurel Fork was incorporated as a common carrier and a six-mile (9.6 km) line into Elizabethton, Tennessee was built to carry finished lumber to an interchange with the Virginia and Southwestern Railway.

A June 13, 1924, flood on the Doe River washed away much track and roadbed along the floodplain. Coupled with diminished production from the mill, this led to a November 7 filing for abandonment that year with the Interstate Commerce Commission. Some operations continued after the flood, but all virtually all logging along the Laurel Fork ceased by 1927.  Parts of the railroad grade are used by the Appalachian Trail in the Pond Mountain Wilderness Area through the Laurel Fork valley between Dennis Cove and Hampton.

Laurel Fork Railway rolling stock

The Laurel Fork Railroad locomotive roster included three 70-3 Shay geared steam locomotives, road numbers Nos. 1, 2, and 3 c/n 2390, 2391, and 2760, respectively.  Two smaller Shays have been incorrectly identified by several authors as being owned by the Laurel Fork. Conversion work on c/n 187 was performed at their shops for another owner. The Laurel Fork has been mistakenly identified as owner of c/n 2195 due to a Lima clerical error. The equipment roster for the rail company also included two log loaders; a steam shovel; 40 flat cars; 12 service cars; and a Model T Ford on dump car wheels that was used for inspection trips. As a freight-only carrier, the Laurel Fork Railway owned no passenger equipment.

References
Waskiewicz, Fred. "Logging Along the Laurel Fork." National Railway Bulletin. Vol. 63, No. 1, 1998.

Defunct Tennessee railroads
Logging railroads in the United States
Transportation in Carter County, Tennessee
Railway companies established in 1912
Railway companies disestablished in 1927
1912 establishments in Tennessee
Hampton, Tennessee
1927 disestablishments in Tennessee